James Murray is an American actor, puppeteer, voice actor, writer, producer, director, and singer.

Career
James Murray operates in California. With Kevin Carlson and Dina Fraboni, he created and wrote The Adventures of Timmy the Tooth.

Filmography

Television
 Dinosaurs - Additional Dinosaur Performer
 Ghost in the Shell: Stand Alone Complex - Additional Voices
 Greg the Bunny - Susan Monster, Rochester Rabbit, Various Characters
 History of the World... For Now - Rat Monkey
 Late Night Buffet with Augie and Del - Bongo (assistant puppeteer)
 Life with Louie - Additional Voices
 Mack & Moxy - Clixx
 Telling Stories with Tomie dePaola - Goat, Right Hand of Bambolona
 The Adventures of Timmy the Tooth - Cavity Goon, Walter Crunelemuffin, Bob, Skunk the Beatnik
 The Barbarian and the Troll - Axe, Troll King, Kyle
 The Mr. Potato Head Show - Canny, Dr. Fruitcake, Johnny Rotten Apple, Mr. Giblets

Film
 Being John Malkovich - Student Puppeteer (uncredited)
 Good Housekeeping: Melody Magic in Music Land - Spider
 Muppet Classic Theater - Additional Muppet Performer
 Muppets Most Wanted - LA Muppet Performer
 Teenage Mutant Ninja Turtles III - Splinter
 The Brave Little Toaster Goes to Mars - Iron, Satellite #2
 The Muppets - Additional Muppet Performer

Video games
 Grand Theft Auto: San Andreas - Pedestrian
 Soma - Eric Darby
 The Bureau: XCOM Declassified - Outsider Commander
 The Darkness II - Peevish, Additional Voices

Other
 Lady Gaga and the Muppets Holiday Spectacular - Additional Muppet Performer
 The Muppets Take the Bowl - Additional Muppet Performer
 The Muppets Take the O2 - Additional Muppet Performer

Crew work
 Men in Black - Puppeteer
 Monkeybone - Puppeteer
 The Adventures of Timmy the Tooth - Creator, Writer

References

External links
 

Year of birth missing (living people)
Living people
Place of birth missing (living people)
American puppeteers
American male singers
American male actors